Elvar Gunnarsson (born ) is an Icelandic film director and screenwriter. Elvar was in the band ; he graduated from the Icelandic Film School in 2005, and started working there after graduation.

Elvar directed the 2021 film It Hatched, which won the award for Best International Film at the Midwest Weirdfest.

Filmography 

 Einn (2012)
 It Hatched (2021)

References

External links 

 Elvar Gunnarsson at the Icelandic Film Centre
 

1982 births
Elvar Gunnarsson
Elvar Gunnarsson
Living people